NA-29 Peshawar-II is a constituency for the National Assembly of Pakistan.

Area
During the delimitation of 2018, NA-28 (Peshawar-II) acquired most of its area from NA-4 (Peshawar-IV) with a very small part acquired from NA-1 (Peshawar-I). The areas of Peshawar which are part of this constituency are listed below alongside the former constituency name from which they were acquired:
 
Areas acquired from NA-1 Peshawar-I
Chuna Bhatti Phandoo Road

Areas acquired from NA-4 Peshawar-IV
Akhun Abad
Hazar Khwani
Achar Deh Bahadar
Ormur Bala
Ormur Miana
Ormur Payan
Mera Kachori
Tarnab
Chamkani
Phandu
Sori Zai Payan
Musa Zai
Deh Bahadur

Members of Parliament

1970–1977: NW-4 Peshawar-IV

1977–2002: NA-4 Peshawar-IV

2002–2018: NA-4 Peshawar-IV

2018-2022: NA-28 Peshawar-II

Election 2002

 
|-

A total of 2,226 votes were rejected.

Election 2008
General Elections were held on 18 February 2008.

All candidates receiving over 1,000 votes are listed here.

A total of 1,604 votes were rejected.

Election 2013
General Elections were held on 11 May 2013.

All candidates receiving over 1,000 votes are listed here.

A total of 4,707 votes were rejected.

By-election 2017
The seat fell vacant after the death of PTI MNA Gulzar Khan on August 28. A total 15 candidates  contested on 26 October 2017. JUI and QWP (S) withdrew their candidates in favor of Nasir Mousazai of PML-N.

Election 2018 

General elections were held on 25 July 2018.

†JI contested as part of MMA

By-election 2023 
A by-election will be held on 19 March 2023 due to the resignation of Arbab Amir Ayub, the previous MNA from this seat.

See also
NA-28 Peshawar-I
NA-30 Peshawar-III

References

External links 
 Election result's official website

28
28